Idiocracy is a 2006 American sci-fi comedy film directed by Mike Judge and co-written by Judge and Etan Cohen. The plot follows U.S. Army librarian Joe Bauers, who wakes up five hundred years in the future after a botched government hibernation experiment to find himself in a dystopian society run by corporations, where evolution has made humanity stupid because people no longer had to be intelligent and physically fit to survive due to the benefits of technology. The cast includes Luke Wilson, Maya Rudolph, Dax Shepard, Terry Crews, David Herman, Justin Long, Andrew Wilson, and Brad Jordan.

The concept of Idiocracy dates back to a concept Judge envisioned in 1996. Judge finished the script for 3001 in 2001, rewriting the film a year later. Filming took place throughout 2004 at Austin Studios and other cities in Texas. Idiocracy serves as a social satire that touches on issues including anti-intellectualism, capitalism, commercialism, consumerism, corporatocracy, dysgenics, and overpopulation. 20th Century Fox was hesitant to promote the film, refusing to grant it a wide release and did not screen the film for critics. The decision to not market Idiocracy was seen as unexpected, following the success of Office Space (1999), and led to speculation. According to Crews, the film's satirical depiction of corporations made the film financially unviable, while Judge attributed 20th Century Fox's decision to negative test screenings; Judge stated that 20th Century Fox believed that the film would develop a cult following through its DVD release, similar to Office Space.

Idiocracy was released in the United States on September 1, 2006. Since its DVD release, the film has developed a cult following, despite its lackluster performance at the box office. The film received mostly positive reviews from critics, who praised its cathartic themes, although the film has been subject to criticism for its themes of eugenics.

Plot

In 2005, U.S. Army librarian Joe Bauers is selected for a government hibernation experiment as the "most average individual" in the entire military. Lacking a suitable female candidate, the military hires sex worker Rita by paying off her pimp Upgrayedd. When the officer in charge is arrested for running his own prostitution ring under Upgrayedd's tutelage, the experiment is forgotten about. Over the next several hundred years, societal expectations and technological advances lead the most intelligent humans to go childless, while the least intelligent reproduce indiscriminately and create increasingly dumber generations.

Five hundred years later, Bauers and Rita's hibernation chambers are unearthed. Bauers crashes into the apartment of Frito Pendejo. He wanders around what was once Washington, D.C., and finds a population that has become profoundly anti-intellectual, speaking only low registers of English and wallowing in overconsumption and low-brow pop culture. Despite advances in technology, innovations are driven by garish commercialism or extreme simplicity. Believing that he is hallucinating after a year of hibernation, Bauers enters a hospital and realizes the truth. Arrested for not having a bar code tattoo to pay for his doctor's appointment, he is sent to prison after the grossly incompetent Pendejo acts as his lawyer.

Rita resumes her job as a sex worker, but soon realizes that people have become so stupid that they will pay her if she only promises to sleep with them. Bauers is renamed "Not Sure" by a faulty speech-recognition tattooing machine, escapes being placed in jail, and finds Pendejo, who reveals that there is a time machine that can travel back to 2005; Pendejo agrees to guide Bauers and Rita to the time machine after Bauers promises to make him rich via compound interest on a bank account he will open in Pendejo's name when he arrives in the past. The three venture through a gigantic Costco store, where Bauers is identified by a tattoo scanner and arrested.

Bauers is taken to the White House and is appointed Secretary of the Interior, based on his IQ test. President Camacho introduces Bauers to the cabinet and gives him the impossible job of fixing a nationwide food shortage, constant dust bowls, and a crippled economy within one week. Bauers discovers that the nation's crops are being watered with Brawndo, a sports drink produced by a company that also owns the FDA, FCC, and USDA. When he arranges for the irrigation system to be replaced with water, Brawndo's stock plummets, causing massive layoffs and riots without any visible improvement to the crops.

Bauers is sentenced to die in a monster truck demolition derby featuring undefeated "rehabilitation officer" Beef Supreme. However, Beef's grossly oversized truck is crushed when it rams into the building's support pillars while trying to enter the arena, and Bauers manages to defeat the other competitors. Rita and Pendejo discover that Bauers' reintroduction of water to the soil has allowed crops to grow, and they steal a TV camera from the arena to broadcast the sprouting crops on the stadium's Jumbotron, prompting Camacho to grant Bauers a presidential pardon. Bauers and Rita decide to stay in the future, and discover that the time machine was just an amusement ride. Following Camacho's term, Bauers is elected president and marries Rita, with whom he has the world's three smartest children. New vice-president Pendejo marries eight women and fathers 32 of the world's stupidest children.

Cast

 Luke Wilson as Corporal Joe Bauers, the "most average individual" in the United States military
 Maya Rudolph as Rita, a sex worker
 Dax Shepard as Frito Pendejo, an average citizen of the United States
 Terry Crews as Dwayne Elizondo Mountain Dew Herbert Camacho, the dimwitted president of the United States
 Brad "Scarface" Jordan as Upgrayedd: Rita's pimp
 Andrew Wilson as Beef Supreme, a rehabilitation officer
Other cast members include David Herman as the Secretary of State, Justin Long as Doctor Lexus, Stephen Root as Judge Hector, Thomas Haden Church as Brawndo's CEO, and Sara Rue as the Attorney General, in an uncredited role.

Themes
The idea of a dystopian society based on dysgenics can be traced back to the work of Sir Francis Galton. H. G. Wells' The Time Machine postulates a society of humans which has devolved due to lack of challenges, while the "Epsilon-minus Semi-Morons" of Aldous Huxley's Brave New World have been intentionally bred to provide a low-grade workforce; perhaps the best parallel is provided by the short story "The Marching Morons" by Cyril M. Kornbluth.

Production
Early working titles included The United States of Uhh-merica and 3001. Filming took place in 2004 on several stages at Austin Studios and in the Texas cities of Austin, San Marcos, Pflugerville, and Round Rock. Test screenings around March 2005 produced unofficial reports of poor audience reactions. After some re-shooting in the summer of 2005, a UK test screening in August produced a report of a positive impression.

Release
Idiocracys original release date was August 5, 2005, according to Mike Judge. In April 2006, a release date was set for September 1, 2006. In August, numerous articles revealed that release was to be put on hold indefinitely. Idiocracy was released as scheduled but only in seven cities (Los Angeles, Atlanta, Toronto, Chicago, Dallas, Houston, and Mike Judge's hometown, Austin, Texas), and expanded to only 130 theaters, not the usual wide release of 600 or more theaters.  According to the Austin American-Statesman, 20th Century Fox, the film's distributor, was entirely absent in promoting the feature; while posters were released to theaters, "no movie trailers, no ads, and only two stills", and no press kits were released.

The film was not screened for critics. Lack of concrete information from Fox led to speculation that the distributor may have actively tried to keep the film from being seen by a large audience, while fulfilling a contractual obligation for theatrical release ahead of a DVD release, according to Ryan Pearson of the AP. That speculation was followed by open criticism of the studio's lack of support from Ain't It Cool News, Time, and Esquire. Times Joel Stein wrote "the film's ads and trailers tested atrociously", but, "still, abandoning Idiocracy seems particularly unjust, since Judge has made a lot of money for Fox."

In The New York Times, Dan Mitchell argued that Fox might be shying away from the cautionary tale about low-intelligence dysgenics because the company did not want to offend either its viewers or potential advertisers portrayed negatively in the film. This theory has been given extra weight by Terry Crews, who stars in the movie as President Camacho. In a 2018 interview with GQ Magazine, he talked of advertisers being unhappy at the way they were portrayed, which affected the studio's efforts to promote the movie. He said, "The rumor was, because we used real corporations in our comedy (I mean, Starbucks was giving hand jobs) these companies gave us their name thinking they were gonna get 'pumped up', and then we're like, 'Welcome to Costco, we love you' [delivered in monotone]. All these real corporations were like, 'Wait a minute, wait a minute' [...] there were a lot of people trying to back out, but it was too late. And so Fox, who owned the movie, decided, 'We're going to release this in as few theaters as legally possible'. So it got a release in, probably, three theaters over one weekend and it was sucked out, into the vortex".

In 2017, Judge told The New York Times that the film's lack of marketing and wide release was the result of negative test screenings. He added that Fox subsequently decided to not give the film a strong marketing push because the distributor believed it would develop a cult following through word-of-mouth and recoup its budget through home video sales, as Judge's previous film Office Space had.

Box office

Box office receipts totaled $444,093 in the U.S., with the widest release being 135 theaters.

Reception
Although it was not screened in advance for critics, Idiocracy received positive reviews. On Rotten Tomatoes, the film has a score of 71%, with an average rating of 6.4/10, based on 52 reviews. The website's "Critics Consensus" for the film reads, "Frustratingly uneven yet enjoyable overall, Idiocracy skewers society's devolution with an amiably goofy yet deceptively barbed wit." On Metacritic, the film has a score of 66 out of 100, based on reviews from 12 critics, indicating "generally favorable reviews".

Los Angeles Times reviewer Carina Chocano described it as "spot on" satire and a "pitch-black, bleakly hilarious vision of an American future", although the "plot, naturally, is silly and not exactly bound by logic. But it's Judge's gimlet-eyed knack for nightmarish extrapolation that makes Idiocracy a cathartic delight." In an Entertainment Weekly review only 87 words long, Joshua Rich gave the film an "EW Grade" of "D", stating that "Mike Judge implores us to reflect on a future in which Britney and K-Fed are like the new Adam and Eve." The A.V. Clubs Nathan Rabin found Luke Wilson "perfectly cast ... as a quintessential everyman"; and wrote of the film "Like so much superior science fiction, Idiocracy uses a fantastical future to comment on a present. ... There's a good chance that Judge's smartly lowbrow Idiocracy will be mistaken for what it's satirizing."

The film was also well received in other countries. John Patterson, critic for The Guardian, wrote, "Idiocracy isn't a masterpiece—Fox seems to have stiffed Judge on money at every stage—but it's endlessly funny", and of the film's popularity, described seeing the film "in a half-empty house. Two days later, same place, same show—packed-out." Brazilian news magazine Veja called the film "politically incorrect", recommending that readers see the DVD and wrote "the film went flying through [American] theaters and did not open in Brazil. Proof that the future contemplated by Judge is not that far away."

Critic Alexandre Koball, of the Brazilian website CinePlayers.com, gave the movie a score of 5 out of 5. Another staff reviewer wrote, "Idiocracy is not exactly ... funny nor ... innovative but it's a movie to make you think, even if for five minutes. And for that it manages to stay one level above the terrible average of comedy movies released in the last years in the United States."

Home media
Idiocracy was released on DVD on January 9, 2007. It has earned $9 million on DVD rentals, over 20 times its gross domestic box office revenue of under $450,000. In the UK, uncut versions of the film were shown on satellite channel Sky Comedy on February 26, 2009, with the Freeview premiere shown on Film4 on April 26, 2009.

Spin-offs
In August 2012, Crews said he was in talks with director Judge and Fox over a possible Idiocracy spin-off featuring his President Camacho character, initially conceived as a web series. A week before the 2012 elections, he reprised the character in a series of short sketches for Funny or Die. Before the 2016 presidential election, Rolling Stone published an article stating that Judge and Cohen would produce Idiocracy-themed campaign ads opposing Donald Trump's presidential campaign if given permission from Fox to do so. Crews later told Business Insider that the ads would not go forward as planned, but that they would have featured Camacho wrestling in a cage match against the other candidates.

Legacy

During the 2016 Republican Party presidential primaries, the film's co-writer Etan Cohen and others expressed opinions that the film's predictions were converging on accuracy, a sentiment repeated by director Judge during the elections that year. At the time, Judge also compared Republican presidential nominee Donald Trump—who was later elected president—to the film's pro wrestler-turned-president Camacho. When asked about predicting the future, he quipped, "I'm no prophet, I was off by 490 years."

Comparisons have been made between the film and Trump's presidency. An article for Collider pointed out the ways in which Trump's positions echoed the political decisions of the characters in the film in areas such as science, business, entertainment, environment, healthcare, law enforcement, and politics. Internet memes have spawned comparisons to Trump and characters in the film.

See also 
 Kakistocracy
 Dysgenics
 "The Marching Morons"

References

External links

 
 
 
 
 Scenes from the film at the Fox Home Entertainment YouTube channel.

2006 films
2000s science fiction comedy films
American science fiction comedy films
American satirical films
2000s English-language films
Films directed by Mike Judge
Cryonics in fiction
American dystopian films
2000s dystopian films
Films about fictional presidents of the United States
Films set in 2005
Films set in the 26th century
Films shot in Austin, Texas
20th Century Fox films
Films about television
Films set in Washington, D.C.
Films set in the White House
Films with screenplays by Etan Cohen
Films with screenplays by Mike Judge
Films scored by Theodore Shapiro
2006 comedy films
2000s political comedy films
Films about intellectual disability
2000s American films